The Gastonia Rangers were a class A minor league baseball team located in Gastonia, North Carolina. The team played first as the Rangers in the Western Carolinas League (1973–1974). In 1983 and 1984, they played as the Gastonia Expos, as an affiliate of the Montreal Expos. They later returned to the Rangers name in the South Atlantic League (1987–1992), and were affiliated with the Texas Rangers.  Their home stadium was Sims Legion Park. After the 1992 season, the team moved to another North Carolina city, Hickory, and have been known as the Hickory Crawdads ever since.

The End in Gastonia
Charlotte Hornets and Charlotte Knights owner George Shinn purchased the Gastonia franchise from Jack Farnsworth prior to the 1989 season. In doing so, it allowed Shinn the freedom to move the Charlotte Knights to Fort Mill, SC without the move being challenged by the Gastonia franchise under Minor League Baseball's 35-mile territorial right rule.  Once Shinn was able to acquire a Class AAA expansion franchise to play in Fort Mill, he no longer needed to control the interests of the Gastonia franchise and sold the team to Donald Beaver.

"Donald C. Beaver is Owner/President of the New Orleans Zephyrs. He is also the owner and President of the Class-A South Atlantic League Hickory (NC) Crawdads and owner of the Class AAA International League Charlotte Knights. He has ownership in the Pittsburgh Pirates and is on their board of directors.

Beaver received his Bachelor of Science degree from Appalachian State University in 1962 and followed it up with a Masters of Business Administration in 1964. He embarked on a career as a hospital administrator and in 1975 he founded the Brian Center Corporation, where he served as CEO until 1995.

While he achieved success as a nursing home pioneer, Beaver never forgot his love of baseball. He was thrust into the spotlight at an early age as a pitcher in the 1952 Little League World Series. 40 years later he purchased the Gastonia Rangers from George Shinn and relocated the franchise to Hickory, and since then several clubs have been added. In 2000, he was inducted into the Little League World Series Hall of Fame."

This is the last known statistical link of the Gastonia Rangers baseball club.  In their last season, they went 66-70 (.485), 12 games back in the SAL's Northern Division.  While Gastonia, NC no longer has a team in the South Atlantic League it has since 2002 has been home to the Gastonia Grizzlies of the collegiate Coastal Plain League.
Gastonia, NC currently has a team, The Gastonia Honey Hunters, which is owned by property developer Brandon Bellamy.

Notable alumni
Sammy Sosa
Jeff Frye
José Hernández
Robb Nen
Darren Oliver
Iván Rodríguez
Wilson Alvarez
Kevin Belcher
Juan Gonzalez
Donald Harris
Bill Haselman
Jonathan Hurst
Cris Colon
Dean Palmer
Rey Sánchez
Benji Gil
Danny Patterson
Tug McGraw
Jim Sundberg
Mike Hargrove
Dell Curry (one day contract promotion) P
Muggsy Bogues (one day contract promotion) 2B

Former owners
Jack Farnsworth
George Shinn
Fred Nichols - 1974
Pat McKernan - 1973

Stadium
The Gastonia Rangers (as well as the future Gastonia Grizzlies) played at Sims Legion Park.

References
http://minors.baseball-reference.com/teams.cgi?yid=1992&lid=SAL&tid=GST
http://www.openchecklist.com/oc_browse.php?pagetype=set&subpage=setcards&objectkey=08LB
http://louisville.bats.milb.com/about/page.jsp?ymd=20061214&content_id=148682&vkey=about_l112&fext=.jsp&sid=l112
http://www.thebaseballcube.com/players/M/Tug-McGraw.shtml

Defunct South Atlantic League teams
Defunct Western Carolinas League teams
1973 establishments in North Carolina
1974 disestablishments in North Carolina
1987 establishments in North Carolina
1992 disestablishments in North Carolina
Defunct baseball teams in North Carolina
Baseball teams disestablished in 1992
Baseball teams established in 1973
Gastonia, North Carolina